Agabinus is a genus of predaceous diving beetles in the family Dytiscidae. There are at least two described species in Agabinus. They are found in North America.

Species
These two species belong to the genus Agabinus:
 Agabinus glabrellus (Motschulsky, 1859)
 Agabinus sculpturellus Zimmermann, 1919

References

Further reading

 
 
 

Dytiscidae
Articles created by Qbugbot